The archery events at the 1982 Commonwealth Games in Brisbane were held from 2 October to 5 October 1982 at the Murarrie Recreation Reserve. There were two events, one for men and one for women, both using recurve bows. The final standings were decided by an aggregate score after four days of shooting. The women's champion, New Zealand's Neroli Fairhall, became the first paraplegic athlete to win a Commonwealth gold medal.

These games marked the debut of archery as a Commonwealth sport; however, it would not appear again until the 2010 Commonwealth Games in Delhi.

Participating nations

36 archers from 15 nations participated at the 1982 Commonwealth Games.

Medal summary

Medal table

Medalists

See also
Archery at the 1980 Summer Olympics
Archery at the 1984 Summer Olympics

References

1982 Commonwealth Games events
1982
Commonwealth Games
International archery competitions hosted by Australia